The 2007–08 Speed Skating World Cup was a multi-race tournament over a season of speed skating. The season began on 9 November 2007 and lasted until 22 February 2008. The World Cup was organised by the ISU, who also run world cups and championships in short track speed skating and figure skating.

Races

WC 1, Salt Lake City, Utah, United States, 11–13 November

The first World Cup meet of the season was held in the Utah Olympic Oval, which last staged an international meet in March, the 2007 World Single Distance Speed Skating Championships. The meet resulted in three world records and one equalled world record in the first four races for men, like in the meet held here during the 2005–06 season, when six races resulted in four world records.

Race results

WC 2, Calgary, Canada, 16–18 November

Race results

WC 3, Kolomna, Russia, 1–2 December
The meet was originally scheduled to be held in Moscow, in the Krylatskoye Ice Rink, but Krylatskoye has been closed due to safety issues and the event moved to the Kolomna Speed Skating Center in Kolomna.

Race results

WC 4, Heerenveen, Netherlands, 7–9 December

Race results

WC 5, Erfurt, Germany, 15–16 December

Race results

WC 6, Hamar, Norway, 25–27 January

Race results

WC 7, Baselga di Piné, Italy, 2–3 February

Race results

WC 8, Inzell, Germany, 16–17 February

Race results

WC 9, Heerenveen, Netherlands, 22–24 February

Race results

Men's overall results

100 m

Source: SpeedSkatingStats.com

500 m

Source: SpeedSkatingStats.com

1000 m

Source: SpeedSkatingStats.com

1500 m

Source: SpeedSkatingStats.com

5000/10 000 m

Source: SpeedSkatingStats.com

Team pursuit

Source: SpeedSkatingStats.com

Women's overall results

100 m

Source: SpeedSkatingStats.com

500 m

Source: SpeedSkatingStats.com

1000 m

Source: SpeedSkatingStats.com

1500 m

Source: SpeedSkatingStats.com

3000/5000 m

Source: SpeedSkatingStats.com

Team pursuit

Source: SpeedSkatingStats.com

References

07-08
ISU Speed Skating World Cup, 2007-08
ISU Speed Skating World Cup, 2007-08